Judy Canova (November 20, 1913 – August 5, 1983),  born Juliette Canova (some sources indicate Julietta Canova), was an American comedian, actress, singer, and radio personality. She appeared on Broadway and in films. She hosted her own self-titled network radio program, a popular series broadcast from 1943 to 1955.

Biography

Early career
She was born in Starke, Florida, one of seven siblings, to Joseph Francis Canova, a businessman, and Henrietta E. Canova (née Perry), a singer. Young Juliette (or Julietta) became "Judy" and began her show-business career with a family vaudeville routine, joining her sister Annie and brother Zeke. Their performances as the Three Georgia Crackers took them from Florida theaters to the Village Barn, a Manhattan club. Canova sang, yodeled, and played guitar, and she was typed as a wide-eyed likable country bumpkin, often barefoot and wearing her hair in braids, sometimes topped with a straw hat. Sometimes she was introduced as The Ozark Nightingale or The Jenny Lind of the Ozarks. In an interview with Rosemary Clooney she said that her family came from the Pyrenees Mountains of Spain, though other sources say the island of Menorca.

Stardom: Radio, Broadway, films, and recordings
When bandleader Rudy Vallée offered the still-teenaged Canova a guest spot on his radio show in 1931, The Fleischmann Hour, the door opened to a career that spanned more than five decades. The popularity of the Canova family led to numerous performances on radio in the 1930s, and they made their Broadway theater debut in the revue Calling All Stars. An offer from Warner Bros. led to specialty appearances in short subjects and minor features before she signed with Paramount Pictures for one year.

Canova left the movies in 1939 to star in a Broadway musical comedy, Yokel Boy, opposite Buddy Ebsen. Executives at Republic Pictures, whose customer base was largely in rural areas, saw Yokel Boy and signed Canova in 1940, shortly after the show ended its run. Judy Canova quickly became Republic's leading female star, playing country gals who always blundered into trouble, in such titles as Scatterbrain (1940), Sis Hopkins (1941), and Joan of Ozark (1942). Strangely, Canova did not appear in Republic's film adaptation of Yokel Boy; her role was taken by Joan Davis.

Canova left Republic in 1943 over a salary dispute and was quickly signed by Columbia Pictures for three feature films, each released annually. Republic wooed her back in 1951 to star in comedy features, now in color, and she made six more pictures through 1955.

She recorded for the RCA Victor label. 

In 1943, she began her own radio program, The Judy Canova Show, that ran for 12 years: first on CBS and then on NBC. Playing herself as a love-starved Ozark bumpkin dividing her time between home and Southern California, Canova was accompanied by a cast that included voicemaster Mel Blanc as Pedro (using the accented voice he later gave the cartoon character Speedy Gonzales) and Sylvester (using the voice that later became associated with the Looney Tunes character); Ruth Perrott as Aunt Aggie; Ruby Dandridge as Geranium; Joseph Kearns as Benchley Botsford; and Sharon Douglas as Brenda. Gale Gordon, Sheldon Leonard, Gerald Mohr, and Hans Conried also appeared sporadically.

During World War II, she closed her show with the song "Goodnight Soldier" ("Wherever you may be... my heart's lonely... without you") and used her free time to sell U.S. War Bonds. After the war, she introduced a new closing theme that she once said she remembered her own mother singing to her when she was a small child:
Go to sleep-y, little baby.
Go to sleep-y, little baby.
When you wake
You'll patty-patty cake
And ride a shiny little pony.

Television
Her radio and movie careers ended in 1955. Canova made a smooth transition to television; she never transitioned the radio show to a standalone television series (in contrast to many of her contemporaries) but made frequent guest appearances on The Colgate Comedy Hour, The Steve Allen Show, Matinee Theatre, Alfred Hitchcock Presents, The Mickey Mouse Club, The Danny Thomas Show, and other shows. In 1967, she portrayed Mammy Yokum in an unsold TV pilot adapted from Al Capp's Li'l Abner. She also worked on Broadway and in Vegas nightclubs through the early 1970s, touring with the revival of No, No Nanette in 1971. She appeared as a mystery guest on the TV show What's My Line on July 18, 1954.

Business
In 1954, Canova and her husband obtained controlling interest in Camera Vision Productions Incorporated. The Los-Angeles-based firm developed a new type of camera which was reported to reduce production costs for TV film and motion pictures from 30 to 50 percent by providing automatic adjustments of steps that previously had to be done manually.

Personal life
Her first husband (1936–39) was Robert Burns—a New York insurance man, not the comedian-actor. While still legally wed to Burns, she became romantically involved with Edgar Bergen in 1937 before breaking the engagement. Canova was next briefly married to James Ripley in 1941; the union was annulled later that year. Her third marriage was to Chester B. England in 1943, which ended in divorce by 1950. Her fourth and final husband was musician Filberto Rivero in 1950. She lived in Palm Springs, California, from 1956 to 1959. The union produced a daughter, Diana, but the marriage ended in 1964. Diana Canova is an actress best known for her role as Corinne on Soap.

Death
In 1983, at age 69, Judy Canova died from cancer and her ashes were interred in the secluded Columbarium of Everlasting Light section, at Forest Lawn Memorial Park Cemetery in Glendale, California. Her ashes are among those of her siblings Annie and Zeke Canova.

Canova is honored with a star on the Hollywood Walk of Fame for her contribution to the film industry (6821 Hollywood Boulevard) and a second star for her radio career (6777 Hollywood Boulevard).

Filmography
Features:

 In Caliente (1935) – Specialty Singer
 Going Highbrow (1935) – Annie
 Broadway Gondolier (1935) – Hillbilly Specialty (uncredited)
 Artists & Models (1937) – Toots
 Thrill of a Lifetime (1937) – Herself
 Scatterbrain (1940) – Judy Hull
 Sis Hopkins (1941) – Sis Hopkins
 Puddin' Head (1941) – Judy Goober
 Sleepytime Gal (1942) – Bessie Cobb
 True to the Army (1942) – Daisy Hawkins
 Joan of Ozark (1942) – Judy Hull
 Chatterbox (1943) – Judy Boggs
 Sleepy Lagoon (1943) – Judy Joyner
 Louisiana Hayride (1944) – Judy Crocker
 Hit the Hay (1945) – Judy Stevens / Helen Rand
 Singin' in the Corn (1946) – Judy McCoy
 Honeychile (1951) – Herself
 Oklahoma Annie (1952) – Herself
 The WAC from Walla Walla (1952) – Herself
 Untamed Heiress (1954) – Herself
 Carolina Cannonball (1955) – Herself
 Lay That Rifle Down (1955) – Herself
 The Adventures of Huckleberry Finn (1960) – Sheriff's Wife
 Cannonball! (1976) – Sharma Capri

Short Subjects:
 The Song of Fame (1934) – Herself
 Husband's Holiday (1935)
 Meet the Stars #7: Meet Roy Rogers (1941) – Herself
 Meet the Stars #8: Stars Past and Present (1941) – Herself
 Screen Snapshots: Radio Shows (1945) – Herself
 Screen Snapshots: Fashions and Rodeo (1945) – Herself
 Screen Snapshots: The Judy Canova Show (1946) – Herself
 Screen Snapshots: Famous Hollywood Mothers (1947) – Herself

Listen to
 OTR Network Library: The Judy Canova Show (10 episodes), otr.net; accessed December 12, 2014.

Bibliography
 Ohmart, Ben. Judy Canova: Singin' in the Corn, BearManor Media, 2010.

References

External links

 
 
 Canova Family Tree
 Judy Canova at Find a Grave
 Kevin Lause, "Judy Canova" in St. James Encyclopedia of Pop Culture.
 Judy Canova Yahoo Group
 "Tex and Judy" video clip.

1913 births
1983 deaths
20th-century American actresses
20th-century American singers
20th-century American women singers
Actresses from Palm Springs, California
American film actresses
American radio actresses
American television actresses
Burials at Forest Lawn Memorial Park (Glendale)
Deaths from cancer in California
People from Starke, Florida
Vaudeville performers